Wilbert London III (born August 17, 1997) is an American track and field athlete specializing in sprinting events. Three-year track and field letterwinner at Waco High School. His 200m personal best is 20.72 seconds at Austin, TX. His 400m personal best is 44.47 seconds, which he ran at the 2017 USA Outdoor Track and Field Championships, where he placed third and advanced to the 2017 World Championships in London at the age of only 19.

At the 2016 IAAF World U20 Championships, London ran a time of 45.27s in the 400m to place 2nd. He also won a gold medal as a member of the  relay team. The Following year he won a silver medal as a member on the 2017 IAAF World Championships  team in London.

Personal bests

References

External links
 
 
 
 

1997 births
Living people
Sportspeople from Waco, Texas
Track and field athletes from Texas
American male sprinters
African-American male track and field athletes
Baylor Bears men's track and field athletes
World Athletics Championships athletes for the United States
World Athletics Championships medalists
Athletes (track and field) at the 2019 Pan American Games
Pan American Games track and field athletes for the United States
Pan American Games silver medalists for the United States
Pan American Games medalists in athletics (track and field)
World Athletics Championships winners
Medalists at the 2019 Pan American Games
21st-century African-American sportspeople